The 3rd Parliament of Ceylon was a meeting of the Parliament of Ceylon, with the membership determined by the results of the 1956 parliamentary election between 5 and 10 April 1956. The parliament met for the first time on 19 April 1956 and was dissolved on 5 December 1959.

References
 
 
 
 
 
 
 
 
 
 
 

Parliament of Sri Lanka
1994 Sri Lankan parliamentary election